Cornelis Johannes Maria "Cor" Lambregts (born 22 April 1958) is a retired Dutch long-distance runner. He competed in the marathon at the 1984 Summer Olympics, but failed to finish.

References

1958 births
Living people
Athletes (track and field) at the 1984 Summer Olympics
Dutch male long-distance runners
Olympic athletes of the Netherlands
People from Roermond
Sportspeople from Limburg (Netherlands)
20th-century Dutch people